Sisorinae is a subfamily of fishes in the family Sisoridae.

Sisoridae
Fish subfamilies